Robert Cornwall (born 16 October 1994) is an Irish footballer who plays as a defender for USL League One club Northern Colorado Hailstorm.

Career
Cornwall began his career with the youth side for St Patrick's Athletic, before moving to Shelbourne in the summer of 2012. In 2013, he played with Shelbourne's first team, making 22 appearances.

In 2014, Cornwall moved to Shamrock Rovers, also spending time on loan with Derry City in 2015.

He moved to Bohemians in December 2016, going on to spend five years with the Bohs and making 130 appearances for the club in all competitions.

In December 2021, it was announced Cornwall would move to the United States to sign with third-tier USL League One side Northern Colorado Hailstorm ahead of their inaugural season in 2022.

References

1994 births
Living people
Republic of Ireland association footballers
Association footballers from County Dublin
Association football defenders
St Patrick's Athletic F.C. players
Shelbourne F.C. players
Shamrock Rovers F.C. players
Derry City F.C. players
Bohemian F.C. players
Northern Colorado Hailstorm FC players
League of Ireland players
USL League One players
Republic of Ireland expatriate association footballers
Expatriate soccer players in the United States
Irish expatriate sportspeople in the United States